Almond paste is made from ground almonds or almond meal and sugar in equal quantities, with small amounts of cooking oil, beaten eggs, heavy cream or corn syrup added as a binder. It is similar to marzipan, but has a coarser texture. Almond paste is used as a filling in pastries, but it can also be found in chocolates. In commercially manufactured almond paste, ground apricot or peach kernels are sometimes added to keep the cost down (also known as persipan).

Uses
Almond paste is used as a filling in pastries of many different cultures.  It is a chief ingredient of the American bear claw pastry.  In the Nordic countries almond paste is used extensively, in various pastries and cookies. In Sweden (where it is known as mandelmassa) it is used in biscuits, muffins and buns and as a filling in the traditional Shrove Tuesday pastry semla and is used in Easter and Christmas sweets. In Denmark (where it is known as marcipan or mandelmasse), almond paste is used in several pastries, for example as a filling in the Danish traditional pastry kringle. In Finland almond paste (called mantelimassa) is used in chocolate pralines and in the Finnish version of the Shrove Tuesday pastry laskiaispulla.

In the Netherlands, almond paste (called amandelspijs) is used in gevulde speculaas (stuffed brown-spiced biscuit) and banket.  It is used as filling in the fruited Christmas bread Kerststol, traditionally eaten at Christmas breakfast.  In Germany, almond paste is also used in pastries and sweets. In the German language, almond paste is known as Marzipanrohmasse and sold for example as Lübecker Edelmarzipan, i.e. "high quality marzipan from Lübeck".

It Italy it's known as "pasta di mandorle". The soft paste is molded into creative shapes by pastry chefs which can be used as cake decorations or to make frutta martorana.

Almond paste is the main ingredient of French traditional calisson candy in Aix-en-Provence.  It is used as a filling in almond croissants.

In Turkey, almond paste is traditionally made in Edirne, once the capital of the Ottoman Empire. During the Ottoman era of Turkish history, it was a royal delight mostly used in palace. It is now sold at delight shops in Istanbul and Edirne.

See also
Rainbow cookie
Marzipan

References

Parsi Almond Fish

Almonds
Food ingredients
Food paste

de:Marzipan#Marzipanrohmasse